The Federation of Mexican Athletics Associations (FMAA; Federación Mexicana de Asociaciones de Atletismo) is the governing body for the sport of athletics in México.  Current president is Antonio Pineda Lozano.

History

FMAA was founded in 1925 as Federación Atlética Nacional or Federación Atlética Mexicana and after changing its name to Federación Mexicana de Atletismo (FMA) was affiliated to the IAAF in 1933.  Recently, in May 2011, the Federación Mexicana de Asociaciones de Atletismo was created.

Affiliations
FMAA is the national member federation for México in the following international organisations:
International Association of Athletics Federations (IAAF)
North American, Central American and Caribbean Athletic Association (NACAC)
Association of Panamerican Athletics (APA)
Asociación Iberoamericana de Atletismo (AIA; Ibero-American Athletics Association)
Central American and Caribbean Athletic Confederation (CACAC)
Moreover, it is part of the following national organisations:
Mexican Olympic Committee (COM; Comité Olímpico Mexicano)

Members

FMAA comprises the associations of the Mexican
States, the federal district, and of IMSS, IPN and U.N.A.M.

National records
FMAA maintains the Mexican records in athletics.

References

External links
Official Webpage (in Spanish)
FMAA on Facebook (in Spanish)

Mexico
Sports governing bodies in Mexico
Sport in Mexico
National governing bodies for athletics
Sports organizations established in 1925
Athletics in Mexico